"It's Me Bitches" (censored as "It's Me Snitches"), is a song by American hip hop recording artist and record producer Swizz Beatz. The song, released February 13, 2007, serves as the lead single from his debut studio album, One Man Band Man (2007). The single debuted on the Billboard Hot 100 at number 100 and peaked at number 83.

An edited version of the song was featured on the Madden 2008 soundtrack. The song gained popularity on So You Think You Can Dance when Robert Muraine gave a fairly lengthy audition set to the edited instrumental version of the song, and it was used again in season 6, episode 11 of Entourage.

Background
The unusual beat was created by Swizz Beatz while having fun and felt to make a song. The warping effect was from Crazy Town's Hollywood Babylon. He recalled:  "I did the beat because I felt like making the beat."

Music video
The music video was directed by Benny Boom. Cameo appearances include Bone Thugs-n-Harmony, Fabolous, DJ Felli Fel, and DJ Enuff of Hot 97.

Charts

Remix

A remix was released entitled "It's Me...(Remix)", which was also included on the album. It features fellow American rappers Lil Wayne and Jadakiss, along with singer-songwriter R. Kelly. The track was number 85 on Rolling Stones 100 Best Songs of 2007 saying

The line on Wayne's verse, "He so sweet make her wanna lick the wrapper, so I let her lick the rapper", was later popularized on his 2008 hit single, "Lollipop", taken from his sixth studio album, Tha Carter III.

References

2006 songs
2007 singles
Swizz Beatz songs
Universal Motown Records singles
Song recordings produced by Swizz Beatz
Songs written by Swizz Beatz
Music videos directed by Benny Boom